Mandalzade Husamaddin Pasha was an Ottoman statesman and admiral. In 1770 he was decorated as commander of the Ottoman navy.

Career 
Mandalzade Hüsameddin was a trained sailor from the Husamaddin shipyard. Mandalzade was appointed in 1769 and reached the rank of mirmiran. The Russo-Turkish War in 1770 continued. Eğribozlu İbrahim Pasha was appointed High Admiral. The Ottoman navy was neglected when he took office and had become very weak.

The Russian spies sent to Britain for working with the instigation of uprising against the Ottoman Empire between the Orthodox citizens released. To support this rising from the sea under the command of the Russian Navy, Admiral Grigory Spiridov moved toward entering the Mediterranean from Gibraltar. Pasha's fleet on July 5, 1770 Husamaddin Sheep Islands area was faced with a fleet of Admiral Spiridov. Ships in the fleet was injured in the clash and fire broke out in both. Despite all the objections of the fleet commanders of the Algerian Hassan Pasha, Pasha Husamaddin by moving water between the port of Izmir Cesme Adası'yla anchored off the gum. Pasha, the Ottoman navy Inebahtı Husamaddin this decision the following day since the war that led to a defeat would have been the first major.

On July 6, a fire boat of the British fleet entered the port of Cesme. A vulnerability was waiting for the British and Russian navies. Pasha, the Ottoman navy in the open sea, showed the courage to fight Husamaddin removing. Ottoman ships anchored side by side without a place to escape and caught fire. Without even the need to make war on the Ottoman fleet was completely destroyed. Algerian Hassan Pasha, survived with injuries. After the war, known as the Battle of Chesma, Husamaddin Pasha was dismissed. On October 22, 1770 instead of Algerian Hassan Pasha was appointed captain-Deryalığa.

References 
Turkish Wikipedia

Ottoman Empire admirals
18th-century Ottoman military personnel
People of the Russo-Turkish War (1768–1774)